USS Resourceful (AFDM-5), (former YFD-21), was a AFDM-3-class floating dry dock built in 1943 and operated by the United States Navy.

Construction and career 
YFD-21 was built at the Everett Pacific Shipbuilding Shipyard, in Everett, Washington in 1943. She was commissioned in February 1943.

Assigned to the Pacific Fleet, USS Chickasaw (AT-83) departed Seattle, Washington, on 11 March 1943 for Pearl Harbor, Territory of Hawaii, towing the floating dry dock YFD-21, and arrived on 30 March 1943. Draco towed YFD-21 from Seattle by way of Pearl Harbor to Espiritu Santo, arriving 5 May 1943. On 4 July 1945, USS Wildcat (AW-2) shifted to YFD-21 for the remainder of her repairs. In 1945, the unnamed dry dock was re-designated AFDM-5. The USS Safeguard (ARS-50) added section G of AFDM-5 to her tow and continued on to Pearl Harbor on 29 July 1946, in company with three YTBs.

During the Vietnam War, AFDM-5 was recommissioned and in 1962, was given the motto "Alta Et Sica", which translates to "High and Dry". She was based in Subic Bay for the rest of her career. After a short period drydocked in AFDM-5 at Subic Bay, the USS Benner (DD-807) sailed to Hong Kong for rest and recreation on the 31 January 1967. The USS Albatross (MSC-289) entered the floating dry dock on the 15th and, by 25 October 1967, was underway for Sasebo. USNS Corpus Christi Bay (T-ARVH-1) was in the floating drydock in 1968. USS Grasp (ARS-24) made another dry dock period but this time inside the AFDM-5, in late September 1968. On 26 April 1969, the USS Abnaki (ATF-96) got underway bound for Guam with AFDM-5 in tow.

USS Sanctuary (AH-17) was dry docked inside AFDM-5 in 1970. In 1979, she was finally named Resourceful.

On 1 January 1987, USNS Spica (T-AFS-9) and USS Catawba (T-ATF-168) were dry docked inside Resourceful. Later in the same year, USNS Silas Bent (T-AGS-26) was also dry docked.

In early 1990s, USS Kinkaid (DD-965) was being repaired on board the dry dock. On 19 April 1992, Resourceful was towed to Yokosuka after the closure of the U.S. Naval Base Subic Bay. On 22 August 1997, Resource was decommissioned for the last time and stricken on the same day. She would then be transferred to the Local Redevelopment Agency (LRA), in the Philippines on 6 April 1999.

The dry dock has kept the name AFDM-5 and provided repair services around the Subic Bay Freeport Zone. In 2012, MV Logos Hope was dry docked inside AFDM-5. From 30 October 2017 to 15 February 2018, BRP Ramon Alcaraz (PS-16) was dry docked inside of her. From 26 March to 26 April 2018, she repaired the MV Lorcon Bacolod. In late 2018, the dry dock was seen sunk in port until it was removed in late 2021.

Awards 

 American Campaign Medal 
 Asiatic-Pacific Campaign Medal
 World War II Victory Medal 
 National Defense Service Medal 
 Philippines Liberation Medal

References

Floating drydock back at Subic Freeport
U.S. Navy tows its last drydock from Philippines

External links 
NavSource: Resourceful (AFDM-5)
Hull Number: AFDM-5 DEPLOYMENTS
TogetherWeServed: Resourceful (AFDM-5) Crew Members

World War II auxiliary ships of the United States
Vietnam War auxiliary ships of the United States
Floating drydocks of the United States Navy
1943 ships
Ships built in Everett, Washington